Matschie's dwarf gecko (Lygodactylus conradti), also known commonly as Conradt's dwarf gecko, is a species of lizard in the family Gekkonidae. The species is native to East Africa. There are no valid subspecies.

Etymology
The specific name, conradti, is in honor of Leopold Conradt, collector of the holotype.

Geographic range
L. conradti is found in northeastern Tanzania and Kenya.

Habitat

Behavior
L. conradti is diurnal and arboreal.

Diet
L. conradti eats fruit and preys upon small insects.

Reproduction
L. conradti is oviparous. Clutch size is two eggs.

References

External links
https://web.archive.org/web/20070929013959/http://www.zooinstitutes.com/Zoology/continents.asp?name=AFRICA

Further reading
Broadley DG, Howell KM (1991). "A check list of the reptiles of Tanzania, with synoptic keys". Syntarsus 1: 1–70.
Matschie P (1892). "Über eine kleine Sammlung von Säugethieren und Reptilien, welche Herr L. Conradt aus Usambara (Deutsch-Ostafrika) heimgebracht hat ". Sitsungs-Berichte der Gesellschaft naturforschender Freunde zu Berlin 1892: 101–110. (Lygodactylus conradti, new species, p. 109). (in German).
Rösler H (2000). "Kommentierte Liste der rezent, subrezent und fossil bekannten Geckotaxa (Reptilia: Gekkonomorpha)". Gekkota 2: 28–153. (Lygodactylus conradti, p. 92). (in German).
Spawls, Stephen; Howell, Kim; Hinkel, Harald; Menegon, Michele (2018). Field Guide to East African Reptiles, Second Edition. London: Bloomsbury Natural History. 624 pp. . (Lygodactylus conradti, p. 103).

Lygodactylus
Reptiles described in 1892